The 1867 Minnesota gubernatorial election was held on November 5, 1867 to elect the governor of Minnesota. Incumbent governor William Rainey Marshall was reelected to a second term.

Results

References

1867
Minnesota
gubernatorial
November 1867 events